Glen Ronald Mitchell (born 11 May 1958) is a retired British cyclist. He competed in the team pursuit event at the 1980 Summer Olympics.

Cycling career
In addition to his Olympic Games representation he also represented England and won a bronze medal in the 4,000 metres team pursuit, at the 1978 Commonwealth Games in Edmonton, Alberta, Canada.

Mitchell is a 10 times British track champion, winning the British National Omnium Championships in 1986, the British National Team Pursuit Championships in 1977 & 1979, the British National Madison Championships in 1977 & 1979, the British National Points Championships in 1980, 1981 & 1983 and the British National Scratch Championships in 1977 & 1981.

References

External links
 

1958 births
Living people
British male cyclists
Olympic cyclists of Great Britain
Cyclists at the 1980 Summer Olympics
Cyclists from Greater London
Commonwealth Games medallists in cycling
Commonwealth Games bronze medallists for England
Cyclists at the 1978 Commonwealth Games
Medallists at the 1978 Commonwealth Games